Dan Bunz (born October 7, 1955) is a former American football linebacker who played for the San Francisco 49ers and Detroit Lions of the National Football League (NFL) in an eight-year career that lasted from 1978 to 1985.

Bunz played at Oakmont High School, the University of California, Riverside, and California State University, Long Beach before being drafted in the first round of the 1978 NFL Draft by the 49ers. He had a small role in the 1979 movie North Dallas Forty. He has been teaching physical education at Sutter Middle School, in Sacramento, California for over 22 years.

The Stop
In Super Bowl XVI (January 24, 1982), Bunz made one of the most famous tackles in NFL history. On a critical 3rd-and-Goal from the 1-yard line, Cincinnati Bengals quarterback Ken Anderson passed to Charles Alexander in the right flat, but Bunz came up fast, grabbed Alexander around the waist, and hurled him backward before he could break the plane of the goal line. Had Bunz tackled Alexander low, his momentum certainly would have carried him into the end zone.  Known as "The Stop", the play was followed by another stop on 4th down, slowing Cincinnati's comeback and ultimately propelling the 49ers to their first Super Bowl title.

Personal life
Bunz is a lifelong Placer County resident who grew up in Roseville with his older siblings Ben and Dennis. He retired from the Detroit Lions at age 30 after a contract dispute, and became a teacher at Sutter Middle School in Sacramento. He and his wife own a farm on the Placer County Wine Trail.

In 1984 Bunz opened Bunz & Company restaurant and sports bar in his hometown of Roseville, California.  He sold the restaurant in 1999, and it closed in the summer of 2012. On January 19, 2013, Bunz and some other entrepreneurs opened 2H - 2nd Half at Bunz & Company in the same location as the original Bunz and Company.
 
He appeared in an episode of HGTV's Yard Crashers when his daughters' back yard got a makeover. Hillside Terrace (2012)

References

External links 

Bywater Hollow Lavender

1955 births
Living people
American football linebackers
Long Beach State 49ers football players
UC Riverside Highlanders football players
Detroit Lions players
San Francisco 49ers players
Sportspeople from Roseville, California
Oakmont High School alumni
Players of American football from California